Nailah Thorbourne (Born 27 November 1983), better known by her stage name Nyla, is a Jamaican singer and songwriter from Kingston, Jamaica. Nyla was a member of the R&B and reggae duo Brick & Lace whose debut album, Love Is Wicked, was released by Geffen and KonLive in 2007 and featured the chart topping single "Love Is Wicked". She is best known for being featured on Major Lazer's "Light It Up". Today she writes and performs as a solo artist and is currently recording and releasing music with some of the biggest chart topping artists and producers.

Early life 

Nyla Thorbourne was born to a Jamaican father and an African American mother in Kingston, Jamaica. She has 3 sisters, Tasha, Nyanda and Candace Thorbourne. Nyla went to Campion College High School during which time her group Brick & Lace was formed. After graduating high school Nyla studied marketing at Miami Dade College.

Career

2006–2012: Brick & Lace and Bloodline 

Nyla's career in music began as a member of the pop / reggae group Brick & Lace. In 2006 the group signed a record deal with Akon's Konvict Muzik / Geffen Records and released their debut album, Love Is Wicked in 2007. The album spawned four charting singles... "Never Never", "Get That Clear", "Bad to di Bone" and their biggest hit to date, "Love Is Wicked", which was listed for 97 weeks in 7 different charts worldwide. 
In 2010, Nyla and her sisters formed a songwriting team called: Bloodline. They have written songs for Kelly Rowland, Christina Aguilera, Nicole Scherzinger, Leah Labelle and Arash. In 2012, she co-wrote the gold-certified, chart topping single "Follow the Leader", performed by Wisin & Yandel featuring Jennifer Lopez. "Follow the Leader" made strides all over the Latin charts and was one of the major releases in the Latin market the year it released.

2014–present: Solo debut 
In 2015, Nyla was featured on the song "Light It Up" by Major Lazer, a track from their album Peace Is the Mission. Later, a remix of the song featuring Fuse ODG was released as a single, which received highly positive reviews and charted top 10 and reached the #1 spot in many countries throughout Europe. The song also topped many digital formats (i.e. Spotify, Pandora and Shazam). In 2016 Nyla also featured on the song "Good Vibe" alongside Warner Bros Recording artist Strobe. The record was well received with over 1 million streams to date on Spotify. In 2017 Nyla picked up right where she left off with the release of the Ed Sheeran "Shape Of You" (Major Lazer Remix) feat. Nyla & Kranium.

Discography

Singles

As lead artist
 2013: Stand up
 2014: Body Calling
 2019: Faith
 2019: We Can Believe In (with Paul Secondi & Monarques)
 2020: Mad Out (with Mr. Vegas and Topo La Maskara)
 2020: Fuego (with Topo La Maskara)
 2020: Bam Bam (with Freezy & Topo La Maskara)
 2020: Shake It (with Topo La Maskara and Deewunn)
 2020: Hard & Done (with Jugglerz and Charly Black)
 2020: One Love (with Maor Levi)

As featured artist

References

External links
 

1983 births
Living people
Jamaican rappers
Jamaican people of English descent
Reggae fusion artists
Ragga musicians
Jamaican reggae singers
21st-century Jamaican women singers
Jamaican dancehall musicians
Musicians from Kingston, Jamaica
American women singer-songwriters
21st-century American women singers
21st-century American singers
Jamaican people of American descent